Medoff is a surname. Notable people with the surname include:

Jillian Medoff (born 1963), American author
Kara Medoff Barnett (born 1978), American business executive, theatre producer and arts administrator
Mark Medoff (born 1940), American playwright, screenwriter, film and theatre director, actor and professor
Marshall Medoff (1945—2016), American economist
Rafael Medoff (born c. 1959), American historian